A Dutch documentary film is a documentary film made by a director of (partly) Dutch origin. Dutch documentary films are not necessarily bound to Dutch topics or locations in the Netherlands.

History

Before 1945
The first known Dutch documentary was made in 1916 by Johann Vierboom. The film Storm en noodweer in Nederland shows the 1916 flood disaster at the coasts of the Zuiderzee. Another documentary film of this era is Holland Neutraal: De leger- en vlootfilm (1917) by Willy Mullens. One of the most famous Dutch documentary film directors is Joris Ivens. Ivens started making his own films in 1928. The first was an avant-garde look at a Rotterdam bridge, The Bridge (De brug, 1928). His later films were more realistic, socially concerned and polemical.
The Spanish Earth (1937) is one of his most famous films. In order to make internationally oriented documentaries, Ivens travelled to countries such as the Soviet Union, Spain, China, Australia and the United States.

1945-1965
After the 2nd World war, films of the acclaimed documentary film directors Bert Haanstra
and Herman van der Horst
dominated Dutch cinema. Their work is internationally known as the ‘Dutch Documentary School’.
A feature of the documentary films of this era is the use of human beings as a metaphor.
Van der Horst and Haanstra both won prizes at the Cannes Film Festival.

Van der Horst's most famous movie is Faja Lobbi (1960), while Haanstra gained international fame for his renowned documentary Alleman (The Human Dutch, 1963). Other directors of the Dutch Documentary School are Charles Huguenot van der Linden,
and John Fernhout.

After 1965
After the era of the Dutch Documentary School, Dutch documentaries lost their uniformity. Instead of forming a group, joining forces and sharing stylistic trademarks, filmmakers mostly worked on independent projects or projects for television networks. Contemporary documentary directors have produced a wide variety of works. Contemporary directors with international successes are Jos de Putter, Heddy Honigmann, Johan van der Keuken and Leonard Retel Helmrich. In the late 20th century, documentary films are mainly shown on Dutch television networks, although some cinemas and art houses show Dutch documentary films. Nowadays, internet provides worldwide access to Dutch documentary films displayed online.

Dutch organizations regarding documentary films

Dutch funds
The Netherlands Film Fund offers financial support to develop, actualize and distribute documentary film productions, designated for cinema.
Mediafonds offers subsidy for the development and production of, among other things, documentary films by public broadcasting.

Online broadcasting
Holland Doc 24 is a Dutch digital documentary channel. The channel is continuously broadcasting sections of multiple public broadcasting channels, including the programs VPRO's Import, Zembla, Tegenlicht, NCRV Dokument, Profiel, Reporter and Het uur van de Wolf.

The Docsonline Foundation is an independent, Dutch non-profit organization with a mission to support professional documentary makers financially by exposing their work on a wide international scale to a paying audience. The foundation organizes a documentary on-demand website which provides a collection of over 400 documentary films.

Film festivals
The following Dutch film festivals are known to show (Dutch) documentary films:
International Documentary Film Festival Amsterdam, the world's largest documentary film festival held annually in Amsterdam.
Netherlands Film Festival, an annual film festival held in Utrecht. Dutch film productions are exhibited, including documentaries.
International Film Festival Rotterdam, an annual film festival held in Rotterdam
Beeld voor Beeld festival in Amsterdam is an annual documentary film festival with a main focus on ethnographic film.
 Movies that matter Festival is an annual film festival, emphasizing on documentary films about human rights.

List of Dutch documentary films

See also
Cinema of the Netherlands
Documentary film

Notes and references

External links
Dutch directors guild  association for all Dutch TV and film directors.
Documentary producers Netherlands association for acknowledged large and medium-sized Dutch documentary producers.
Article by Dutch documentary film maker Jos de Putter (2011) Nederlandse documentaires in een tijd van schaarste. Mediafonds magazine.
Netherlands Film Fund official page

 
Netherlands
Documentary